Jo Yun-mi (born 5 January 1987 in Pyongyang) is a North Korean football player that plays for the North Korea women's national football team. She played in the 2011 FIFA Women's World Cup.

International goals

References

External links

North Korean women's footballers
1987 births
Living people
2011 FIFA Women's World Cup players
Asian Games medalists in football
Footballers at the 2010 Asian Games
North Korea women's international footballers
Asian Games silver medalists for North Korea
Women's association footballers not categorized by position
Medalists at the 2010 Asian Games